This is a list of organizations involved in research in or advocacy of tribology, the scientific and engineering discipline related to friction, lubrication and wear.

Government
Argonne National Laboratory 
NASA - Glenn Research Center 
National Center for Scientific Research (CNRS) 
National Research Council (Canada)
Southwest Research Institute

Advocacy and Professional societies
American Bearing Manufacturers Association (ABMA)					
American Gear Manufacturers Association (AGMA)					
American Society of Mechanical Engineers (ASME)							
International Federation for the Promotion of Mechanism and Machine Science (IFToMM) 
Institution of Engineering and Technology 
Institution of Mechanical Engineers (IMechE) 
Institute of Physics		
Society of Tribologists and Lubrication Engineers (STLE) (USA)

Publications

Lubricants
Proceedings of the Institution of Mechanical Engineers, Part J: Journal of Engineering Tribology
Tribology Letters
Tribology Transactions 
Wear

Higher education

Austria 

 TU Wien

Australia

Curtin University 
University of New South Wales
University of Western Australia

Belgium 
 Ghent University
 KU Leuven

Brazil 
 University of São Paulo 
 Federal University of Uberlandia  
 Federal University of Espírito Santo

Canada

Dalhousie University 
University of Waterloo 
University of Windsor

China

Chinese Academy of Sciences 
Chinese Academy of Sciences 
Tsinghua University
Qingdao University of Technology

Chile

Pontificia Universidad Católica de Chile (UC)

Czech Republic 

 Brno University of Technology

France

Ecole Centrale de Lyon 
INSA Lyon / University of Lyon 
University of Poitiers

Germany
Technical University of Clausthal (ITR)
Karlsruhe Institute of Technology (KIT) 
Leibniz Universität Hannover (IMKT)
Otto von Guericke University Magdeburg 
RWTH Aachen University 
Technical University of Berlin 
Technical University of Munich

India 

 Indian Institute of Science Bangalore 
 Indian Institute of Technology Delhi 
 Indian Institute of Technology Kanpur 
 Indian Institute of Technology (Indian School of Mines), Dhanbad 
 Indian Institute of Technology Rupnagar
National Institute of Technology Srinagar
Indian Institute of Technology Tirupati - 
 Indian Institute of Technology Indore

Japan

Kanazawa University 
Kobe University 
Nagoya University 
Niigata University 
Tokyo University

Korea

KAIST 
Korea University 
Yonsei University 
Kookmin University

Malaysia

International Islamic University Malaysia 
Universiti Malaya 
Universiti Kebangsaan Malaysia 
Universiti Teknologi MARA 
Universiti Teknikal Malaysia Melaka 
Universiti Teknologi Malaysia 
Universiti Sains Malaysia

Netherlands

Delft University of Technology 
University of Twente

New Zealand

Auckland University of Technology

Norway 

 Norwegian University of Science and Technology

Pakistan 

 National University of Science and Technology

Portugal

Aveiro University
University of Coimbra

Russia

Slovenia 

 University of Ljubljana

Sweden

Luleå University of Technology 
Uppsala University 
KTH Royal Institute of Technology

Switzerland 

 EPFL 
 ETH Zurich

United Kingdom

Bournemouth University 
Cardiff University 
Imperial College London 
National Physical Laboratory 
University of Bradford 
University of Cambridge - Tribology Research Group
University of Central Lancashire - Jost Institute for Tribotechnology
University of Leeds - Institute of Functional Surfaces
University of Leicester - Mechanics of Materials Research Group
University of Loughborough - Dynamics Research Group
University of Oxford - Solid Mechanics & Materials Engineering
University of Sheffield - The Leonardo Tribology Centre
University of Southampton - National Centre for Advanced Tribology (nCATs)
University of Strathclyde

United States

Auburn University - Multiscale Tribology Laboratory and the Undergraduate Tribology Minor
Georgia Institute of Technology - Tribology Research Group
George Mason University - Tribology and Surface Mechanics (TSM) Group
Gonzaga University - Tribology Research Laboratory
Lehigh University - Surface Interfaces and Materials Tribology Laboratory
Louisiana State University - Center for Rotating Machinery
Massachusetts Institute of Technology - Sloan Automotive Laboratory
Miami University - Ye Research Group
Northwestern University - Center for Surface Engineering and Tribology
Pennsylvania State University - Tribology/Materials Processing Lab
Purdue University - Mechanical Engineering Tribology Laboratory
Rice University - Additive Manufacturing, Performance and Tribology Center
Rochester Institute of Technology - Tribology Laboratory
Texas A&M University - Rotor Dynamics Laboratory Tribology Group
University at Buffalo - Dynamics, Control and Mechatronics
University of Akron - Timken Engineered Surfaces Laboratories
University of California, Berkeley - Tribology Group
University of California, Merced - Tribology Group
University of Dayton - Tribology Group
University of Delaware - Materials Tribology Laboratory
University of Florida - Tribology Laboratory
University of Illinois at Urbana Champaign - Tribology and Microtribodynamics Laboratory
University of Pennsylvania - Carpick Group
University of Texas at Arlington - Turbomachinery and Energy Systems Laboratory
University of Utah - Nanotribology and Precision Engineering Laboratory
University of Nevada Reno - 
University of North Dakota - Advanced Manufacturing and Tribology Laboratory
University of Wisconsin - Madison - Eriten Research Group

See also
 Tribology
 Friction
 Wear
 Lubrication

Tribology

ar:قائمة منظمات تقنية النانو